Sargassum muticum, commonly known as Japanese wireweed or japweed, is a large brown seaweed of the genus Sargassum. It is an invasive seaweed with high growth rate (up to 10 cm per day during spring). It has an efficient dispersion thanks to its floats.

Description
Sargassum muticum is a brown seaweed, normally brown to yellowish with a length up to 10 m. It is an autotroph that uses energy from sunlight. The photosynthesis is facilitated thanks to aerial vesicles which allow the algae to rise to the surface.

Sargassum muticum is composed of two distinct parts: a perennial part, which contains the holdfast and one or more short main axes; and an annual part: the secondary axes, which develop on the main axis, whose growth is unlimited and whose size is variable. There are three types of ramifications: laterals with foliaceous expansions called fronds, laterals with fronds and aerocysts and laterals with fronds, aerocysts and reproductive organs called receptacles. In winter, only the perennial part persists (5 cm). In summer, the lateral part is in maximum development of 2–3 meters to 10 meters.

Reproduction
The mode of reproduction is both sexual and asexual. S. muticum reaches sexual maturity in the summer when gamete production takes place in receptacles. The species is monoecious, i.e. an individual is capable of producing male and female gametes. Its cycle of development is monogenic (i.e. only one generation is present during its life cycle). At the level of fertilization: male gametes are dispersed in seawater while female gametes remain in the receptacle where fertilization takes place). Development is also done at the receptacle and then once at the stage of seedling, the latter is detached for fixation on a new support and form a new individual. This species can also reproduce asexually, but this has never been observed in temperate environments.

Habitat
Sargassum muticum grows from half-tide to infralittoral areas (to a depth of 10 m.). It is fixed on solid substrates like rocks, stones, shells.  It is highly tolerant towards temperature and salinity variations. The optimal temperature is between 17 and 20 °C but it tolerates -9 and 30 °C.

Repartition areas, invasiveness, impacts

Repartition areas

Originally from Japan, it is thought to have gained worldwide distribution through being transported with Japanese oysters (Crassostrea gigas). Sargassum muticum was introduced to the Californian coast in the 1940s and in Europe in the 1970s (The species was first found in the British Isles in the Isle of Wight in 1973). Currently, the alga is widespread from Norway to Portugal along Atlantic coasts. Sargassum muticum has a range stretching from Campbell River, British Columbia to Baja in California. In Europe it extends along the coasts of Great Britain, France, Scandinavia, Baltic Sea, Helgoland, Netherlands, Ireland, the Iberian Peninsula and into the Mediterranean from Italy and the Adriatic. It is recorded from Japan, China and Alaska. Recently, some specimens were found on Moroccan coasts. This illustrates its huge tolerance regarding its environment.  Herbarium specimens are now stored in the Ulster Museum (BEL catalogue numbers: F11241 - F11242; F11182 - F11185).

Invasiveness and impacts

Its proliferation is important especially during the summer, which causes economic and ecological problems.

Ecological: Because of its large size and dense ramifications, S.muticum forms a screen within the water column preventing the penetration of light. It also captures the nutrients in disfavor of other species such as phytoplankton. However, S.muticum also serves as shelter and protection for fish larvae or crustaceans as well as laying support for cuttlefish.

Economic: S.muticum fixes itself to the shells of oysters, creating problems in shellfish farming through increased manual work to eliminate the algae. In addition, it can wrap around the farming structures, requiring additional maintenance. It also gets entangled with the propellers of the boats.

Options for removal

Mechanical removal—however this promotes dissemination of the species and the technique is labor-intensive.

Chemical—the use of herbicides is advised against, because it poses a major risk to the environment and other organisms.

Biological—there are few natural predators. One example is a little copepod that will eat only the unhealthy and damaged parts of S. muticum.

Currently the distribution is stabilized, and only mechanical removal is performed.

Uses
There are some potential uses for Sargassum muticum.

In agriculture, algae are used as sources of nitrate and potash for fertilization. It is also used in aquaculture as feed for juvenile sea cucumbers.

Water treatment: the cell walls of S. muticum contain alginates and fucoidans. The association of both molecules forms a bigger molecule and this one can be a flocculant. This process can be a method to catch organic matter present in sewage. This flocculant, rich in proteins and oligoelements, is easily biodegradable and could be used for fertilizer.

Previous studies have shown that Sargassum muticum is able to carry out the biosorption of heavy metals like cadmium, chlorophenolic compounds, and nickel.

Antifouling: Secondary metabolites produced by marine algae could be an interesting alternative antifouling agent. Previous studies have shown the potential of hydrocarbon and fatty acid compounds in antifouling activities, compounds such as galactolipids and palmitic acid, 1-tetradecene or 1-hexadecene. Moreover, the peak production of antifouling compounds is during the spring.

Antioxidant compounds: Sargassum muticum is rich in antioxidant compounds such as phenolic compounds (cathechins, phlorotannins, quercetins), pigments (fucoxanthin) and vitamins(vitamin C, K, E in the form of alpha-tocophérol and gamma-tocopherol). Applications are possible in pharmaceuticals, cosmetics and health fields, thanks to the antioxidant activities of these molecules.

References

External links
 Sargassum muticum (aquatic plant) at Global Invasive Species Database
 Video footage of Japanese Wireweed in the Venice lagoon
 http://www.algaebase.org/search/species/detail/?species_id=90
 http://habitas.org.uk/invasive/species.asp?item=432707
 http://www.observatoire-biodiversite-bretagne.fr/especes-invasives/Faune-et-flore-marines/Flore-marine/La-sargasse-Sargassum-muticum
 http://www.seaweed.ie/sargassum/index.php

Fucales
Flora of Japan
Marine biota of Asia